Ngaoui is a town and commune in Cameroon.

As of May 26, 2014, 4,722 refugees fleeing violence in the Central African Republic had crossed into Cameroon at Ngaoui.

The nearest refugee camps are Borgop and Ngam.

See also
Communes of Cameroon

References

 Site de la primature - Élections municipales 2002 
 Contrôle de gestion et performance des services publics communaux des villes camerounaises - Thèse de Donation Avele, Université Montesquieu Bordeaux IV 
 Charles Nanga, La réforme de l’administration territoriale au Cameroun à la lumière de la loi constitutionnelle n° 96/06 du 18 janvier 1996, Mémoire ENA. 

Communes of Cameroon
Cameroon–Central African Republic border crossings
Populated places in Adamawa Region